Wallsend Slipway & Engineering Company Ltd was formerly an independent company, located on the River Tyne at Point Pleasant, near Wallsend, Tyne & Wear, around a mile downstream from the Swan Hunter shipyard, with which it later merged.

History

The Company was formed by Charles Mitchell, a shipbuilder, in November 1871 as The Wallsend Slipway Co. with the objective of repairing the shipping vessels of various shipowners with whom he had recently established a business relationship.

One of the first ships repaired was the Earl Percy berthed in 1873.

In 1874 Willam Boyd was appointed managing director and it was Boyd who introduced marine engine building to the firm - this becoming over the next decade its most important activity - which brought the words 'Engineering' into the full title of the firm which then became ' The Wallsend Slipway and Engineering Co Ltd'. In 1903 Swan Hunter took a controlling interest in the Company.

The company manufactured Parsons turbines under license for ships including the famous  and numerous British warships.

In 1977 the business was nationalised and became part of British Shipbuilders. The site then passed to AMEC which operated it as part of an offshore facility known as the Hadrian Yard: it was responsible for pre-fabricated construction of the Gateshead Millennium Bridge completed in 2001 and also conducted fitting out of the Bonga FPSO in 2003.

Amec mothballed the yard in 2004. It was announced in April 2008 that the site was to be sold and then in November 2008 the site was acquired by Shepherd Offshore.

In March 2009, SLP, a Suffolk-based engineering business, announced that it would lease part of the yard from Shepherd Offshore to build offshore gas production platforms for the North Sea.

References

Further reading

External links

Defunct shipbuilding companies of the United Kingdom
Defunct engineering companies of England
Marine engine manufacturers
Defunct companies based in Tyne and Wear
Wallsend
Manufacturing companies established in 1871
Manufacturing companies disestablished in 2005
1871 establishments in England
2005 disestablishments in England
British companies established in 1871
Engine manufacturers of the United Kingdom